Ranuccio Scotti Douglas or Ranuzio Scotti Douglas (19 July 1597 – 10 May 1659) was a Roman Catholic prelate who served as Bishop of Borgo San Donnino (1627–1650), Apostolic Nuncio to Switzerland (1630-1639), and Apostolic Nuncio to France (1639–1641).

Biography
Ranuccio Scotti Douglas was born on 19 July 1597 in Parma, Italy.
On 22 March 1627, he was appointed during the papacy of Pope Urban VIII as Bishop of Borgo San Donnino. On 18 April 1627, he was consecrated bishop by Laudivio Zacchia, Bishop of Corneto and Montefiascone and installed on 30 May 1627. On 20 May 1630, he was appointed by Pope Urban VIII as Apostolic Nuncio to Switzerland. On 7 September 1639, he was appointed by Pope Urban VIII as Apostolic Nuncio to France. In 1641, he resigned as Apostolic Nuncio to France. He served as Bishop of Borgo San Donnino until his resignation on 13 March 1650. He died on 10 May 1659.

Episcopal succession

References

Sources

Surchat, Pierre Louis (1979). Die Nuntiatur von Ranuccio Scotti in Luzern 1630–1639. Studien zur päpstlischen Diplomatie und zur Nuntiaturgeschichte des 17. Jahrhunderts. Rom-Freiburg-Wien 1979 [Römische Quartalschrift. 36. Supplementheft].

External links
 (for Chronology of Bishops) 
 (for Chronology of Bishops) 
 (for Chronology of Bishops) 
 (for Chronology of Bishops) 
 (for Chronology of Bishops) 
 (for Chronology of Bishops) 

1597 births
1659 deaths
17th-century Italian Roman Catholic bishops
Bishops appointed by Pope Urban VIII
Apostolic Nuncios to Switzerland
Apostolic Nuncios to France